Suppressor of fused homolog is a protein that in humans is encoded by the SUFU gene.
In molecular biology, the protein domain suppressor of fused protein (Sufu) has an important role in the cell. The Sufu is important in negatively regulating an important signalling pathway in the cell, the Hedgehog signalling pathway (HH). This particular pathway is crucial in embryonic development. There are several homologues of Sufu, found in a wide variety of organisms.

Function 

SUFU encodes a component of the sonic hedgehog (SHH) / patched (PTCH) signaling pathway. Mutations in genes encoding components of this pathway are deleterious for normal development and are associated with cancer-predisposing syndromes (e.g., holoprosencephaly, HPE3, basal cell nevus syndrome, BCNS, and Greig cephalopolysyndactyly syndrome, GCPS).Sufu has also been found to have a crucial role in tumour suppression. To be more specific, it has a tumour-suppressor gene that predisposes, or in other words makes individuals more susceptible to medulloblastoma, because it modulates the SHH signalling pathway. The N-terminal domain, which this entry refers to contains Gli transcription factors.

Interactions 

SUFU has been shown to interact with GLI1, GLI3 and PEX26.

Conservation
The human ortholog of Drosophila suppressor of fused, has a conserved sequence, this means that particular amino acids have remained the same throughout evolution. Consequently, they have very similar roles in  repressing Hedgehog signalling. It represses the Gli and Ci transcription factors of the Hedgehog pathway, and functions by binding to these proteins and preventing their translocation to the nucleus. Homologues of Sufu have been found in bacteria. However their function remains to be elucidated.

Structure
Sufu is actually protein that contains two domains. In eukaryotic Sufu, an additional domain is found at the C terminus of the protein. This protein domain also binds to the C-terminal domain of the Gli/Ci transcription factors, inhibiting their activity.

Genes
Human gene that encodes SUFU, also named SUFU, is found to be localized on chromosome 10q24–25, and contains 12 exons.

References

Further reading

External links